Ravenfield is a first-person shooter game developed by Swedish programmer Johan Hassel, who goes by the pseudonym SteelRaven7. It was released on 18 May 2017 as an early access title for Windows, macOS and Linux.

Gameplay 
The game incorporates rag-doll-like physics, with many options to give users the ability to control the AI, including a 'battle plan', and many other game factors such as AI count. Ravenfield consists of multiple team game modes that revolve around capturing areas on the map and gaining points by killing members of the enemy team. The game is inspired by other multiplayer first-person shooter games such as Battlefield and Call of Duty. Modding is supported via the Steam Workshop, with community members designing their own maps, weapons, vehicles and accompanying lore.

A second mode, titled Conquest, combines the pre-existing elements of large scale combat with turn based strategy, similar to the Galactic Conquest mode seen in Star Wars: Battlefront II (2005 video game). Game levels are represented by tiles on the map, and each tiles can hold up to three battalions. The objective of conquest mode is to capture the opposing team's headquarters.

Plot 
While Ravenfield has no plot per se, during the 2019 Halloween Event, SteelRaven7 hinted at the possibility of an underlying plot in the game. It is speculated that more will be revealed in future updates to the Conquest game mode. In July 2020 an update was released overhauling the Spec Ops game mode. It also introduced the first named characters, TALON team. TALON team is a 4 man special forces unit in the Eagle army. Later in December of that year 2 new characters were added: The Advisor, a second in command to the player character, and EYES, a reconnaissance specialist who assists TALON with avoiding enemy patrols and locations objectives.

Development 
Ravenfield started out as an experiment with ragdolls and AI. The beta version was released on itch.io on 3 July 2016. The game was posted on Steam Greenlight on 1 February 2017, and it was officially released as an early access title on 18 May 2017.

The current Ravenfield version is Early Access 26.

Reception 
Christopher Livingston of PC Gamer called the game "glitchy” and "fun".

The game boasts an "Overwhelmingly Positive" review score on Steam, and a 4.8/5 on itch.io.

Nathan Grayson of Kotaku criticized Ravenfield as "glitchy" and "barely functional in some places"; however, he noted its ability to support a high number of computer-controlled players and expressed fascination with its good reception by players on Steam. The game supports Steam Workshop, and creators from the community have added new weapons, vehicles, maps, and features that add to and expand the game's vanilla feel, which was well received by players.

Notes

References

External links 
Official Website
Beta version on itch.io

2017 video games
Windows games
MacOS games
Linux games
Indie video games
First-person shooters
Single-player video games
Video games developed in Sweden